Mariano Gerada (1766–1823) was a Maltese sculptor.

He was trained in Valencia, Spain, and gained fame with his polychrome wooden statues, whose exquisite curves reveal a deep knowledge of Gothic devotional images. Various titular statues carved in wood by the artist can be found around Malta, among them that of Our Lady full of Grace at Zabbar; the Assumption of Our Lady, known as Santa Marija, sculpted for the village of Ghaxaq; and Saint Catherine of Alexandria at Zurrieq. The statue of the Archangel Michael in the parish church of Cospicua is considered another of his masterpieces. The draft model for the  Saint Michael statue was made out of the wood that remained from that used to carve the statue of the Assumption at Ghaxaq, and it can still be found in the sacristy of the Ghaxaq parish church.

Among Gerada's non-religious statues are the Lion and Unicorn fountains to the left and right of the entrance of St. John's Co-Cathedral in Valletta. They were carved from local limestone.

References

 Artnet

1766 births
1823 deaths
18th-century Maltese sculptors
18th-century male artists
19th-century Maltese sculptors